Marquess of Queensberry is a title in the Peerage of Scotland. The title has been held since its creation in 1682 by a member of the Douglas family. The Marquesses also held the title of Duke of Queensberry from 1684 to 1810, when it was inherited by the Duke of Buccleuch.

History
The feudal barony of Drumlanrig was held by Sir William Douglas, illegitimate son of The 2nd Earl of Douglas and Mar, some time before 1427, when he died. His descendant William Douglas, 9th of Drumlanrig, was created the 1st Earl of Queensberry in 1633.

The subsidiary titles of Lord Queensberry are: Earl of Queensberry (created 1633), Viscount Drumlanrig (1628) and Lord Douglas of Hawick and Tibbers (1628), all in the peerage of Scotland. He is also a Scottish baronet, styled "of Kelhead", created 26 February 1668, so the 6th Marquess was the 5th Baronet. The courtesy title used by Lord Queensberry's eldest son and heir is Viscount Drumlanrig. There is no special courtesy title for Lord Drumlanrig's eldest son and heir.

The family seat of the Marquesses of Queensberry was Kinmount House in the parish of Cummertrees, south Scotland, which was sold by the 9th Marquess in 1896. The traditional burial place of the Marquesses of Queensberry is the Douglas family mausoleum at Cummertrees Parish Church.

The 9th Marquess is particularly well known because of the rules of boxing that were named after him (the Marquess of Queensberry rules), and for his litigious interaction with Oscar Wilde.

On 22 June 1893, Queen Victoria raised Francis Archibald, Viscount Drumlanrig, the heir of the 9th Marquess, to the peerage of the United Kingdom as Baron Kelhead. Francis, Lord Drumlanrig, died without descendants the following year and the title "Baron Kelhead" became extinct.

Lairds of Drumlanrig
William Douglas, 1st of Drumlanrig (died 1427)
William Douglas, 2nd of Drumlanrig (died 1458)
William Douglas, 3rd of Drumlanrig (died 1464)
William Douglas, 4th of Drumlanrig (died 1484)
James Douglas, 5th of Drumlanrig (died 1498)
William Douglas, 6th of Drumlanrig (died 1513)
James Douglas, 7th of Drumlanrig (died 1578)
James Douglas, 8th of Drumlanrig (died 1615)
William Douglas, 9th of Drumlanrig, 1st Earl of Queensberry (died 1640) (became Earl of Queensberry in 1633)

Earls of Queensberry (1633)
William Douglas, 1st Earl of Queensberry (died 8 March 1639/40)
James Douglas, 2nd Earl of Queensberry (died 1671)
William Douglas, 3rd Earl of Queensberry (1637–1695) (became Marquess of Queensberry in 1682, and Duke of Queensberry in 1684)

Marquesses (1682) and Dukes of Queensberry (1684)

William Douglas, 1st Duke of Queensberry (1637–1695)
James Douglas, 2nd Duke of Queensberry (1672–1711) (became Duke of Dover in 1708)
James Douglas, 3rd Marquess of Queensberry, (1697–1715)
Charles Douglas, 3rd Duke of Queensberry, 4th Marquess of Queensberry (1698–1778) (Dukedom of Dover extinct in 1778)
William Douglas, 4th Duke of Queensberry, 5th Marquess of Queensberry (1725–1810)

The 2nd Duke of Queensberry surrendered all of his titles except the Marquessate and its subsidiary titles to the Crown and obtained a new grant under the same precedence (1684) with remainder to the Dukedom and those subsidiary titles bypassing his second son to his third son and further to the heirs male and female of the 1st Earl of Queensberry.  Upon his death the Marquessate passed to James Douglas, 3rd Marquess and a homicidal maniac known as "the Cannibalistic Idiot." He was excluded from his father's titles after the duke's death, which instead passed to Charles Douglas, 3rd Duke.  The 3rd Duke also succeeded as Marquess upon the latter's death at age 17.

The Dukedom of Queensberry passed by special remainder to the heirs male or female of the 1st Earl of Queensberry who was Henry Scott, 3rd Duke of Buccleuch, son of Francis Scott, Earl of Dalkeith through Lady Jean Douglas (married to Francis Scott, 2nd Duke of Buccleuch) who was eldest daughter surviving infancy of the 2nd Duke of Queensberry.

Marquesses of Queensberry from 1810 (cont. 1682)
Charles Douglas, 6th Marquess of Queensberry (1777–1837)
John Douglas, 7th Marquess of Queensberry (1779–1856)
Archibald William Douglas, 8th Marquess of Queensberry (1818–1858)
John Sholto Douglas, 9th Marquess of Queensberry (1844–1900)
Percy Sholto Douglas, 10th Marquess of Queensberry (1868–1920)
Francis Archibald Kelhead Douglas, 11th Marquess of Queensberry (1896–1954)
David Harrington Angus Douglas, 12th Marquess of Queensberry (born 1929)
The heir apparent is the present holder's son Sholto Francis Guy Douglas, Viscount Drumlanrig (born 1967).
The heir apparent's heir presumptive is his brother Lord Torquil Oberon Tobias Douglas (born 1978).

Baronets, of Kelhead (26 February 1668)
See Douglas baronets
Sir James Douglas, 1st Baronet (1639–1708)
Sir William Douglas, 2nd Baronet (died 1733)
Sir John Douglas, 3rd Baronet (died 1778)
Sir William Douglas, 4th Baronet (died 1783)
Charles Douglas, 6th Marquess of Queensberry (1777–1837)
See above for further succession

Family tree

References

External links

Marquessates in the Peerage of Scotland
Queensberry
Noble titles created in 1682